Edwin Thompson is an American baseball coach and former outfielder, who is the current head baseball coach of the Georgetown Hoyas. He played college baseball at Howard, Maryland and Webber International. He then served as the head coach of the Bates Bobcats (2009–2010) and Eastern Kentucky Colonels (2016–2020).

Playing career
Thompson attended Jay High School in Jay, Maine. Thompson then committed to Howard University, where he was a member of the Howard Bison baseball team. After two seasons at Howard, he transferred to Maryland where he played baseball for a season, before transferring again to play at Webber International University.

Coaching career
On July 23, 2008, Thompson was named the head coach of the Bates Bobcats baseball team. After leading the Bobcats to 11–22 and 25–11 during the 2009 and 2010 seasons respectively, Thompson signed to take an assistant coaching position with the Duke Blue Devils baseball team. After two seasons at Duke, Thompson became the top assistant for the Georgia State Panthers baseball program.

In July 2015, Thompson was named the head coach of the Eastern Kentucky Colonels baseball team. He resigned in September 2020 and accepted a position as head coach at Georgetown University.

Head coaching record

See also
 List of current NCAA Division I baseball coaches

References

External links

Eastern Kentucky Colonels bio

Living people
1980 births
Baseball outfielders
Howard Bison baseball players
Maryland Terrapins baseball players
Webber International Warriors baseball players
Bangor Lumberjacks players
UMaine Farmington Beavers baseball coaches
Bates Bobcats baseball coaches
Duke Blue Devils baseball coaches
Georgia State Panthers baseball coaches
Eastern Kentucky Colonels baseball coaches
Georgetown Hoyas baseball coaches
Baseball coaches from Maine
Baseball players from Maine
African-American baseball coaches
African-American baseball players